Walter Scott Palmer (born October 23, 1968) is an American former professional basketball player who was selected by the Utah Jazz in the second round (33rd pick overall) of the 1990 NBA draft. A 7'1" center from Dartmouth College, Palmer played two years in the NBA for the Jazz and Dallas Mavericks. In his NBA career, he appeared in a total of 48 games and averaged 2.1 points per game.

Palmer later played in basketball leagues in Europe and South America, before transitioning into union activism on behalf of professional athletes in Europe.  He co-founded SP.IN, the first basketball players union in Germany, and served as its general secretary. He became general secretary of the UBE, the federation of European basketball player unions and then co-founded and was the general secretary of the European Elite Athletes Association (EU Athletes) which represents over 25,000 athletes in a number of popular sports. He then worked as the Head of Department for UNI Sport PRO (now the World Players Association), a global platform for athlete unions and a sector of UNI Global Union. In 2014 he was hired as the Director for International Relations and Marketing of the NBA Players Association before resigning in June, 2015. He now works as a consultant for different players associations and sports related businesses.

External links
College & NBA stats @ basketballreference.com

1968 births
Living people
American expatriate basketball people in Argentina
American expatriate basketball people in France
American expatriate basketball people in Germany
American expatriate basketball people in Italy
American expatriate basketball people in Spain
American men's basketball players
Basketball Löwen Braunschweig players
Basketball players from New York (state)
Brose Bamberg players
CB Peñas Huesca players
Centers (basketball)
Dallas Mavericks players
Dartmouth Big Green men's basketball players
Ferro Carril Oeste basketball players
Giessen 46ers players
Le Mans Sarthe Basket players
Liga ACB players
Olimpia Milano players
Riesen Ludwigsburg players
Skyliners Frankfurt players
Sportspeople from Ithaca, New York
Utah Jazz draft picks
Utah Jazz players
Washington-Liberty High School alumni